Monomastix is a genus of green algae in the class Mamiellophyceae. It is the only genus in the family Monomastigaceae, which in turn is the only family in the order Monomastigales.

References

Chlorophyta genera
Mamiellophyceae